Aubrey Feist (December 26, 1903 – 1976) was a British novelist. He is known for the publication, in the 1950s and in the 1960s, of adventure novels for young people.

Works

Novels 
 Key Men, 1937.
 The Eyes of St. Emlyn, 1938.
 High Barbary, 1950.
 Spread Eagle, 1952.
 The Dagger and the Rose, 1961.
 Boy's Choice - A New Book of Stories, 1968.
 The Field of Waterloo, 1969.
 The lion of St. Mark : Venice: the story of a city from Attila to Napoleon, 1970.
 Italian Lakes, 1975.

Short stories 
 Devilstone, 1928 in Everybody’s Magazine.
 House of Fire, 1931 in Ghost Stories.
 The Golden Patio, 1932 in Strange Tales of Mystery and Terror.

Others

Theater 
 The Black Cabinet, 1947.
 Among Those Present, 1951.
 The Devil's Four Poster, 1953.
 Drums of deliverance, 1953.
 Crime at the Cedars, 1972.

Radio 
 The Kingdom Of The Green, 1963.
 No Man's Land, 1964.
 Cavalcade To Cowdray, 1965.
 The Bells of Blandon, 1969.
 The Golden Salamander, 1970.

Links 
 Liste des ouvrages sur Online Computer Library Center
 Crime Fiction IV : A Comprehensive Bibliography 1749-2000
  Bibliothèque nationale de France

References 

20th-century British novelists
Writers from Norwich
1903 births
1976 deaths